Alexander Tolstikov (born 25 January 1973) is a Moldovan and Russian football players' agent, entrepreneur and former footballer. As footballer, in 1990s Tolsticov has played as a forward and midfielder for several Moldovan and Russian clubs.

Career

In 1992–1997 Tolstikov played in Moldovan National Division for Olimpia Bălți (1992), Moldova Boroseni (1992–1993), Torentul Chișinău (1993–1996), MHM-93 Chișinău (1996–1997), Speranța Nisporeni (1997). The 1998 season he spent in the second Russian division, at Irtysh Tobolsk, and in the summer of 1999 has played three matches for the Astrakhan club Volgar-Gazprom in first Russian division. Also he spent some time at the Bulgarian side Avtotreid Aksakovo.

In the early 2000s, he founded the first sports agency in the South-Eastern Asia, working in the Chinese Championship. In the mid 2000s he obtained a football players' agent license, from 2009 he is the owner of the D-Sports agency. In 2011—2012 he was the head of selection section of FC Krasnodar.

In 2015, he became owner of the Portuguese third division club União de Leiria.

References

1973 births
Living people
Moldovan businesspeople
Russian businesspeople
FC Volgar Astrakhan players
CSF Bălți players
Moldovan footballers
Association football midfielders
Moldovan expatriate footballers
Expatriate footballers in Russia
Sports businesspeople